Pseudeutreta anteapicalis is a species of tephritid or fruit flies in the genus Pseudeutreta of the family Tephritidae.

Distribution
Bolivia, Paraguay, Argentina, Brazil.

References

Tephritinae
Diptera of South America
Insects described in 1914